Grigoriy Lomakin (born 18 March 1998) is a Kazakh tennis player.

Lomakin has a career high ATP singles ranking of No. 768 achieved on 15 November 2021. He also has a career high ATP doubles ranking of No. 203 achieved on 26 September 2022. Lomakin made his ATP main draw debut at the 2022 Astana Open in the doubles draw partnering Denis Yevseyev.

Challenger and Futures/World Tennis Tour Finals

Doubles 29 (17–12)

References

External links

1998 births
Living people
Kazakhstani male tennis players
People from Temirtau
Competitors at the 2019 Summer Universiade
21st-century Kazakhstani people